Beulah Wright Porter Price (1869-1928) was an educator, physician, and an active participant in the African American women's club movement in Indianapolis, Indiana, in the early twentieth century. When Porter established a medical practice in Indianapolis in 1897, she became the first African American woman physician in the city with her own practice. However, Porter left her medical practice in 1901 and became a principal of a public school in Indianapolis in 1905. In addition, Porter combined her medical knowledge in conjunction with her involvement in the city's women's club movement. As a co-founder of the Woman's Improvement Club (WIC) of Indianapolis with Lillian Thomas Fox in 1903, Porter used her medical expertise contributed to the early work of the Indianapolis charitable organization whose goal was to combat tuberculosis. The WIC began as a literary club and with a goal of self-improvement to combat medical needs of African Americans, including training nurses. In 1905, Fox, Porter, Ida Webb Bryant and members of the WIC established a tuberculosis camp to treat infected African American children.  Porter was active in other local clubs, including the Grand Body of the Sisters of Charity, and a local chapter of the NAACP.

Dr. Porter's first marriage was to Jefferson D. Porter on March 8, 1893. She married Walter M. Price on November 14, 1914

Notes

1869 births
20th-century deaths
Year of death missing
Educators from Indiana
20th-century American women educators
African-American physicians
African-American women physicians
Physicians from Indiana
19th-century American physicians
19th-century American women physicians
20th-century American educators
People from Indianapolis
Clubwomen
20th-century African-American women
20th-century African-American educators